This is a list of defunct airlines of Croatia.

See also

 List of airlines of Croatia
 List of airports in Croatia

References

 
Airlines
Croatia
Airlines